Lycée André Malraux may refer to:

Schools in France:
 LGT André Malraux - Allonnes - Allonnes
 Lycée professionnel André Malraux - Béthune
 Lycée André Malraux - Biarritz
 Lycée André Malraux - Gaillon 
 Lycée André Malraux - Montataire
 Lycée André Malraux - Montereau-Fault-Yonne

Schools outside of France:
 Lycée Français André Malraux de Murcie in Murcia, Spain 
 Lycée André Malraux in Rabat, Morocco
 Lycée Franco-Centrafricain André-Malraux in Bangui, Central African Republic, which merged into the Lycée Français Charles de Gaulle in 1992